Nicholas Joseph Braun (born May 1, 1988) is an American actor. He is known for his role as Greg Hirsch in the HBO series Succession (2018–present), for which he has received two nominations for the Primetime Emmy Award for Outstanding Supporting Actor in a Drama Series in 2020 and 2022. He has also appeared in several films, including Sky High (2005), Princess Protection Program (2009), Red State (2011), Prom (2011), The Perks of Being a Wallflower (2012), The Watch (2012), Date and Switch (2014), How to Be Single (2016), and Zola (2021).

Career
In 2005, he appeared in the film Sky High as Zach (a.k.a. Zach Attack!). Braun then had roles in the Disney Channel Original Movies Minutemen (2008) and Princess Protection Program (2009).

He played the regular role of Cameron on the ABC Family show 10 Things I Hate About You, until it was cancelled with its final episode airing on May 24, 2010. He appeared in The Secret Life of the American Teenager and portrayed the character Cole Waters on the web series The LXD.

In 2011, he played Lloyd Taylor in Disney's theatrical release Prom, and Billy Ray in Kevin Smith's Red State.

In 2015, he was featured on two tracks on Phantoms' debut EP, Broken Halo. He provided vocals on the title track and on "Voyeur". He also co-starred with Dakota Johnson in both Date and Switch (2014), and How to Be Single (2016).

In 2018, Braun became a member of the main cast of the HBO series Succession, playing Gregory Hirsch. For his performance in the show, Braun received critical acclaim and has been nominated twice for an Emmy award.

Filmography

Film

Television

Web

Music videos

Awards and nominations

References

External links

 
 Official site (Atlantic Records)
 Artist page at Atlantic Records

21st-century American male actors
American male child actors
American male film actors
American male television actors
American male voice actors
Atlantic Records artists
Male actors from New York (state)
People from Bethpage, New York
St. Mark's School (Massachusetts) alumni
Living people
1988 births